Prolixibacter denitrificans is a facultatively anaerobic and nitrate-reducing bacterium from the genus of Prolixibacter which has been isolated from isolated from crude oil.

References

Bacteroidia
Bacteria described in 2015